Metasiodes is a genus of moths of the family Crambidae.

Species
Metasiodes achromatias Meyrick, 1894
Metasiodes calliophis Meyrick, 1894
Metasiodes heliaula Meyrick, 1894
Metasiodes tholeropa Meyrick, 1894

References

Natural History Museum Lepidoptera genus database

Pyraustinae
Crambidae genera
Taxa named by Edward Meyrick